Bathylinyphia is a monotypic genus of Asian dwarf spiders containing the single species, Bathylinyphia maior. It was first described by K. Y. Eskov in 1992, and has only been found in China, in Japan, in Kazakhstan, in Korea, and in Russia.

See also
 List of Linyphiidae species

References

Linyphiidae
Monotypic Araneomorphae genera
Spiders of Asia